Steneurytion morbosus is a species of centipede in the Geophilidae family. It was first described in 1877 by New Zealand naturalist Frederick Hutton.

Description
The original description of this species is based on a pale reddish yellow specimen measuring 1.85 inches in length. This species has 39 to 41 segments.

Distribution
The species occurs in Victoria, south-eastern Australia, as well as in New Zealand.

Behaviour
The centipedes are solitary terrestrial predators that inhabit plant litter, soil and rotting wood.

References

 

 
morbosus
Centipedes of Australia
Fauna of Queensland
Centipedes of New Zealand
Animals described in 1877
Taxa named by Frederick Hutton